"(I'm) Confessin' (that I Love You)" (also known as "Confessin'",  "I'm Confessin'" and "Confessin' that I Love You") is a jazz and popular standard that has been recorded many times.

Background
The song was first produced with different lyrics as "Lookin' For Another Sweetie", credited to Chris Smith and Sterling Grant, and recorded by Thomas "Fats" Waller & His Babies on December 18, 1929.

In 1930 it was reborn as "Confessin'", with new lyrics by Al Neiburg, and with the music this time credited to Doc Daugherty and Ellis Reynolds. Louis Armstrong made his first, and highly influential, recording of the song in August 1930, and continued to play it throughout his career. Unlike the crooners, Armstrong did not try to deliver the original song's lyrics or melody; instead, he smeared and dropped lyrics and added melodic scat breaks.

Cover versions
Other important recorded versions in the United States were done by: 
Chester Gaylord (1930)
Seger Ellis (1930)
Guy Lombardo (1930), Rudy Vallee (1930)
Perry Como (1945)
Les Paul and Mary Ford (1952)
Thelonious Monk (1965)
Anne Murray (1993)
Samara Joy (2022)

The song was also a number one hit for Frank Ifield in the United Kingdom and Ireland in 1963.

See also
List of 1930s jazz standards

References

Songs with lyrics by Al J. Neiburg
Perry Como songs
1930 songs
1963 singles
UK Singles Chart number-one singles
Irish Singles Chart number-one singles
Judy Garland songs
Van Morrison songs
Johnnie Ray songs
Frank Ifield songs
1930s jazz standards
Songs with music by Chris Smith (composer)